The  is a six-axle, three-bogied (Bo′Bo′Bo′) DC electric locomotive designed for fast freight used by Japanese National Railways (JNR) and later operated by its descendants JR West and JR Freight. , 39 locomotives remained in service, all operated by JR Freight.

Variants
 EF66-900: Prototype locomotive EF66 901, delivered in 1966
 EF66-0: Full-production type (EF66 1 – 55), built 1968 to 1975
 EF66-100: Later type (EF66 101 – 133), built 1989 to 1991

Technical
The bogies have an air suspension system to limit the impulsive forces on the track.

Operations
During the JNR era, these locomotives were used for freight trains and also for passenger work - primarily hauling night trains such as the Hayabusa sleeping car limited express.

By 1 April 2009, 73 EF66s (including all 33 EF66-100s) were in service, with 63 owned by JR Freight (all based at Suita Depot in Osaka), and 10 owned by JR West (all based at Shimonoseki Depot).

, 39 locomotives remained in service (six EF66-0 and 33 EF66-100 locomotives), all operated by JR Freight.

As of July 2021 just two EF66-0 examples remain in service, those being EF66-27 & EF66-30

History

Background

With the opening of the Meishin Expressway between Nagoya and Kobe in 1965 and the Tomei Expressway between Tokyo and Nagoya in 1968, JNR faced increasing competition for freight transport from road hauliers. Express freight services formed of these wagons were introduced on the Tokaido Main Line and Sanyo Main Line from October 1966 using Class EF65-500 electric locomotives built in 1965. These locomotives were designed to be used in pairs hauling 1,000-tonne freight trains, but as pairs of locomotives drew excessive current from the overhead wires, 1,000-tonne freight trains had to be split into 600-tonne and 400-tonne sections when operating on the Sanyo Main Line. This led to the need for a new locomotive design that would be capable of hauling 1,000-tonne trains singly.

Prototype

A prototype locomotive, initially classified EF90 and numbered EF90 1, was built by Kawasaki Sharyo in 1966.

EF66 901 was retired from service in 1996, and has been stored at Hiroshima Depot since February of 2001, but it was taken apart in March.

Full-production series
The production series of locomotives were delivered from 1968, with 55 built in two batches between 1968 and 1975.

The second batch of locomotives, EF66 21 to EF66 55, delivered between 1973 and 1975, incorporated a number of minor changes and improvements. Most noticeable was the extension of the cab roofs over the windscreens to reduce the deposition of abrasion dust from the pantographs on the windscreens. Some of the first-batch locomotives (EF66 1 to 20) were also subsequently modified with the "sun visor" style cab end roofs.

Post-privatization
Following the privatisation of JNR on 1 April 1987, JR Freight received the prototype (EF66 901) and 39 of the original series (EF66 1 to EF66 39) as well as the Class EF66-100 machines. JR West obtained the remainder of the machines (EF66 40 to EF66 55) - a total of 16.

Shortly after privatization, JR Freight tried out a number of new experimental liveries on its various locomotives, and one Class EF66, locomotive number EF66 20, received an experimental cream and blue livery with large "JR" logos in August 1987. No other members of the class were reliveried, however, and EF66 20 received the new JR Freight two-tone blue livery when it underwent refurbishment in October 1993.

From 1988, JR Freight retrofitted a number of its EF66s (numbers 22 - 24, 26 - 27, 30 - 33, 37) with roof-mounted cab air-conditioning units.

From 1993, JR Freight started refurbishing its fleet of EF66s (numbers 1 - 5, 7 - 10, 11 - 12, 16 - 39, 41, 44, 53, 55). Refurbishment included rewinding of the traction motor coils, removal of the former JNR decorations on the front-end number plates, and repainting into a two-tone blue livery similar to that carried by the EF66-100s. Locomotives refurbished from 2004 onward, however, received a simplified blue livery, similar to the original JNR-style livery.

EF66-100
Due to increased demand, JR Freight began building more EF66s in 1989. This batch of locomotives was classified EF66-100, with locomotive numbered EF66 101 to EF66 133. The Class EF66-100 locomotives were fundamentally the same design as the EF66-0, but with slightly more modern external styling. The driver's cabs are air-conditioned. The Class EF66 100 locomotives were also built in two batches, EF66 101 to 108 and EF66 109 to EF133. The second batch differed in having rectangular headlamps and tail lamps, while the first batch had round lamps.

Build histories
The individual locomotive build histories are as follows.

Notes

Preserved examples
 EF66 1: Stored at Hiroshima Depot in Hiroshima.
 EF66 11: Preserved at The Railway Museum in Saitama.
 EF66 35: Preserved at the Kyoto Railway Museum in Kyoto.
 EF66 45: (No. 1 end cab section) Preserved at a museum located next to Torokko Saga Station in Kyoto.
 EF66 45: (No. 2 end cab section) Preserved outside the Hoshiai Eye Clinic in Midori-ku, Saitama, Saitama Prefecture.
 EF66 49: (No. 1 end cab section) Preserved at a museum located next to Torokko Saga Station in Kyoto.
 EF66 49: (No. 2 end cab section) Preserved at the Pain Aux Seigle bakery in Kizugawa, Kyoto, located near Kizu Station.

See also
 Japan Railways locomotive numbering and classification
 RENFE Class 251, an electric locomotive type operated by Renfe in Spain based on the EF66

References

Electric locomotives of Japan
EF66
Bo′Bo′Bo′ locomotives
Bo-Bo-Bo locomotives
1500 V DC locomotives
1067 mm gauge locomotives of Japan
Kawasaki locomotives
Kisha Seizo locomotives
Railway locomotives introduced in 1966